Hanafiah bin Mat is a Malaysian politician and currently serves as Terengganu State Executive Councillor.

Election Results

References

Malaysian Islamic Party politicians
Members of the Terengganu State Legislative Assembly
Terengganu state executive councillors
21st-century Malaysian politicians
Living people
Year of birth missing (living people)
People from Terengganu
Malaysian people of Malay descent
Malaysian Muslims